City2Surf (or City to Surf) is a popular road running event held annually in Sydney covering a  course.  The event is a "fun run" as well as a race, attracting both competitive runners and community participants who can choose to run or to walk. The event attracts more than 80,000 entrants who start in staggered groups based on previous running times and early entry.

History
The City2Surf has been held as an annual event since the first run on 5 September 1971, initially as a  run that commenced in George Street, adjacent to Sydney Town Hall. It was conceived by the staff of The Sun newspaper and was inspired by the Bay to Breakers event in San Francisco. The first event was jointly organised by the Amateur Athletic Association of NSW and the NSW Women's Amateur Athletic Association and attracted 1,576 starters, 1,509 of whom completed the event within the 100 minutes time limit. Many of the entrants were registered athletes belonging to the Registered Athletic Clubs that were part of these two bodies. To date, 24 of those entrants, now known as the City2Surf Legends, have run in every City2Surf.

Since 1973 it has been held on the second Sunday in August, except for the race held in 2000, moved to July due to the Sydney Olympics in August.

When The Sun ceased publication in 1988, the sponsorship of the event passed to the new Sunday tabloid The Sun-Herald. 

In 2010, on the event's 40th anniversary, a record 80,000 participants ran, making it the largest run of its kind in the world. That level of participation has continued. The race is still primarily sponsored and organised by The Sun-Herald.

The course record is 40:03, set by Steve Moneghetti in 1991. The women's record is 45:08 minutes, set by Susie Power in 2001. Non-Australian athletes typically won the race from 1995 to 2007, including repeat winners Laban Chege (1999–2000), Patrick Nyangelo Lusato (2003–2005), and Dickson Marwa (2006–2007). In 2008, Martin Dent became the first Australian winner since Lee Troop in 1997. Marwa was competing in the 2008 Olympics.

Since 2010 the course has started in several groups to give preference to faster runners. The first group to start are elite wheelchair athletes, followed by invitation-only seeded and preferred runner groups, followed by runners with previous race times under 70 minutes, runners with previous race times under 90 minutes, an open entry running group, an open entry jogging group, and finally an open entry "Back of the Pack" group for walking, using a wheelchair or pushing child strollers. Entry to all groups is limited to a certain number of competitors and, except for the invitation-only groups, allocated on a first-come first-served basis.

Due to the COVID-19 pandemic the 2020 event, the 50th anniversary, was pushed back from 9 August until 18 October and the live event cancelled for the first time in its history. Instead, the event was run as a virtual event where participants were requested to run the length of the course on local streets using the City2Surf Virtual Run app. In 2021, Sydney had been in another lockdown since June, the physical race was cancelled again and another virtual event scheduled for October.

14 August 2022 saw the return of the live running of the event for the first time since 2019.

Route
The route taken by the participants commences in the city centre of Sydney and passes through the suburbs of East Sydney, Kings Cross, Rushcutters Bay, Double Bay, Rose Bay, Vaucluse, Dover Heights and Bondi Beach. The most difficult part of the course is "Heartbreak Hill" at the halfway mark, a  steep ascent from Rose Bay to Vaucluse along New South Head Road.

Features en route include many amateur bands performing along the suburban roads, and many City2Surf participants dressed in novelty themed costumes.

Winners

Notable events 
Deaths during the race have occurred several times. In years 2000, 2008 and 2014, a competitor died of a heart attack close to the finish line of the race. After the 2008 death, medical academic Michael O'Rourke noted that a runner developing arrhythmia and cardiac arrest happens most years but that the sufferer is usually revived.

The 2016 event was featured in the first season on Ambulance Australia 2018. 300 participants required medical attention, a majority of which needing help after they finished the race.

See also
Real Insurance Sydney Harbour 10k

References

External links
 Official website
 City swell carries African to his hat-trick
 What does it take to be a City2Surf Legend?
 Most results 1971–

Sports competitions in Sydney
Long-distance running competitions
Athletics competitions in Australia
Road running competitions
1971 establishments in Australia
Recurring sporting events established in 1971
Annual sporting events in Australia
Bondi, New South Wales
Point Piper, New South Wales
Rose Bay, New South Wales
Double Bay, New South Wales
Vaucluse, New South Wales
Kings Cross, New South Wales